is the third single of the Hello! Project group, W. It was released on October 14, 2004, on the Zetima label, peaking at #5 on the Oricon charts in Japan and charting for five weeks. The Single V, released on November 17, peaked at #17 on the weekly charts and charted for three weeks.

Track listings

CD

Single V DVD

References

External links 
 Robo Kiss entries on the Up-Front Works official website: CD, Single V

W (group) songs
Zetima Records singles
2004 singles
Song recordings produced by Tsunku
Songs written by Tsunku
2004 songs